"God Forgot" is a song by Australian alternative rock group The Rubens. The song was released on 4 October 2018 as the third and final single from the group's third studio album, Lo La Ru. The song was certified gold in Australia in 2020.

At the APRA Music Awards of 2020, the song was nominated for Most Performed Alternate Work of the Year.

Reception
In an album review Meg Price from Amnplify said the song "is the peppy, pick-me-up dance number". Josh Leeson from The Herald said "God Forgot" is "the album highlight".

Certifications

References

2018 songs
2018 singles
The Rubens songs